Schwortz is a common surname, derived from the German , , meaning the color black. It may refer to:

Eric Schwortz, a musician of band Milagres
Barrie Schwortz, researcher and photographer of the Shroud of Turin Research Project

Germanic-language surnames
German-language surnames
Jewish surnames